Lawrence James McCormick (July 12, 1888 – December 30, 1961) was a Canadian-born American ice hockey player who became a naturalized citizen of the United States on March 17, 1920, and competed in the 1920 Summer Olympics for the American ice hockey team, which won the silver medal.

Larry was the older brother of Joseph McCormick, who served as the captain of the 1920 United States Olympic ice hockey team. While the McCormicks were both from Buckingham, Quebec, they had served in the U. S. Army in France during World War I. Because the brothers each held an honorable discharge from the Army, they were entitled to automatic U.S. citizenship and on March 17, 1920, just five weeks before playing in the 1920 Summer Olympics, they both became naturalized Americans. Prior to the war, both of the brothers played in Pittsburgh for the Pittsburgh Athletic Association and the Yellow Jackets.

References

External links
 

1888 births
1961 deaths
American men's ice hockey centers
Anglophone Quebec people
Canadian emigrants to the United States
Canadian ice hockey players
Ice hockey people from Quebec
Ice hockey players at the 1920 Summer Olympics
Medalists at the 1920 Summer Olympics
Olympic silver medalists for the United States in ice hockey
People from Outaouais
Pittsburgh Athletic Association ice hockey players
Pittsburgh Yellow Jackets (USAHA) players
United States Army personnel of World War I